"She Was" is a song written by Jimmy Melton and Neal Coty, and recorded by American country music singer Mark Chesnutt.  It was released in February 2002 as the lead-off single from his self-titled album.  It peaked at number 11 on the United States country music charts, and number 62 on the U.S. Billboard Hot 100 chart.

Content
The song describes a girl who is asked if she's sure that her lover is the one, and she was. It then describes the life of the same woman who knew what she wanted and did it. Throughout the song, it is revealed that the narrator is a child of the mother.

Music video
The music video was directed by Eric Welch and premiered in early 2002. It was also the last music video Chesnutt ever made.

Chart performance
"She Was" debuted at number 51 on the U.S. Billboard Hot Country Singles & Tracks for the chart week of February 9, 2002.  This was Mark's final top twenty hit.

Year-end charts

References

2002 singles
2002 songs
Mark Chesnutt songs
Songs written by Neal Coty
Song recordings produced by Billy Joe Walker Jr.
Columbia Records singles